Bob George may refer to:

Bob George, owner of Monster truck
B. George
"Bob George", song by Prince from The Black Album (Prince album)

See also
Robert George (disambiguation)